Scardia is an Italian surname, heavily concentrated in the Heel of Italy. It may also refer to:

 5248 Scardia, a main-belt asteroid
 Scardia (moth), a fungus moth genus
 Stachys scardia, a species of Stachys
 a name for the Aristolochia recorded in App. Herb 19